Laura Martínez Abelenda (born 1 December 1998) is a Spanish judoka.

She is the gold medallist of the 2019 Judo Grand Slam Baku in the -48 kg category.

References

External links
 

1998 births
Living people
Spanish female judoka
European Games competitors for Spain
Judoka at the 2019 European Games
20th-century Spanish women
21st-century Spanish women